The Dream Girl is an operetta in three acts with music by Victor Herbert and book by Rida Johnson Young (who also wrote the lyrics) and Harold R. Atteridge. Based on the 1906 play The Road to Yesterday, by Beulah Marie Dix and Evelyn Greenleaf Sutherland, its satiric story concerns reincarnation.  Additional music was written by Sigmund Romberg.  The piece was Victor Herbert's last musical composition, and the work was produced posthumously on Broadway in 1924.

Production
The Dream Girl opened at the Ambassador Theatre on Broadway on August 20, 1924 and ran for 117 performances. It starred Fay Bainter, George LeMaire and Walter Woolf and was staged by J. C. Huffman.

Roles and original cast
Ken Paulton - Edward Basse 
Will Levison - John Clarke
Elspeth - Fay Bainter 
Cristoforo - Edmund Fitzpatrick 
Wilson Addison - George LeMaire 
Bobby Thompkins - Frank Masters 
Elinor Levison - Alice Moffat 
Aunt Harriet - Maude Odell
Mr. Gillette - William Oneal 
Nora - Clara Palmer 
Dolly Follis - Wyn Richmond 
Jimmie Van Dyke - Billie B. Van 
Malena - Vavara 
Jack Warren - Walter Woolf

Musical numbers

Act I
Making a Venus - Bobby Thompkins, Malena, Models and Boys       
All Year Round (Music by Sigmund Romberg) - Jack Warren and Chorus       
Dancing Round - Elspeth and Chorus       
(My) Dream Girl (I Loved You Long Ago) - Jack 
Old Songs - Maidens and Quartette 

Act II
Maiden, Let Me In - Will Levison and Boys       
Gypsy Life - Malena and Chorus       
Stop, Look and Listen - Elspeth, Jimmie Van Dyke and Bobby 
(The) Broad Highway - Jack and Chorus       
My Hero - Elspeth and Jack 
I Want to Go Home (Music by Sigmund Romberg)- Elspeth 

Act III
Bubbles - Dolly Follis and Chorus       
Make Love in the Morning - Jimmie and Dancers       
Saxophone Man - Bobby, Dolly and Chorus       
Dream Girl - Elspeth, Jack and Company

References

External links
The Dream Girl at the IBDB database
Time Magazine review of the original production

English-language operettas
Broadway musicals
Operas
1924 operas
Operas by Victor Herbert
Operas based on plays